The Chicago Bulls are an American professional basketball team based in Chicago, Illinois. They are a member of the Central Division of the Eastern Conference in the National Basketball Association (NBA). The team is owned by Jerry Reinsdorf and Billy Donovan is the current head coach. They play their home games in the United Center. Coached by Johnny Kerr, the team finished its first season with a 33–48 record, the best record achieved by an expansion team in its first year of play, and secured a playoff berth. The Bulls won their first NBA championship in the 1991 NBA Finals while coached by Phil Jackson. They won five additional NBA championships in the 1990s under Jackson.

There have been 21 head coaches for the Bulls franchise. Phil Jackson is also the franchise's all-time leader in regular season games coached, regular season games won, playoff games coached, and playoff games won. Jackson and Jerry Sloan are the only Bulls coaches to have been inducted into the Basketball Hall of Fame as a coach. Kerr, Dick Motta, Jackson, and Thibodeau have won NBA Coach of the Year with the team. Ed Badger, Bill Berry, Bill Cartwright, Pete Myers and Jim Boylan have all spent their entire NBA head coaching careers with the Bulls. Sloan, Cartwright, and Myers formerly played for the Bulls.

Key

Coaches
''Note: Statistics are correct through April 11, 2022.

Notes
 A running total of the number of coaches of the Bulls. Thus any coach who has two or more separate terms as head coach is only counted once.
 Each year is linked to an article about that particular NBA season.

References
General

Specific

Lists of National Basketball Association head coaches by team

Head coaches